Neurosis is an American avant-garde metal band from Oakland, California. It was formed in 1985 by guitarist Scott Kelly, bassist Dave Edwardson, and drummer Jason Roeder, initially as a hardcore punk band. Chad Salter joined as a second guitarist and appeared on the band's 1987 debut Pain of Mind and then Steve Von Till replaced him in 1989. The following year, the lineup further expanded to include a keyboardist and a visual artist. Beginning with their third album Souls at Zero (1992), Neurosis transformed their hardcore sound by incorporating diverse influences including doom metal and industrial music, becoming a major force in the emergence of the post-metal and sludge metal genres.

The band's lineup stabilized in 1995 with the addition of Noah Landis, who replaced Simon McIlroy on keyboards and electronics. That same year they formed the experimental music group Tribes of Neurot and in 1999 the record label Neurot Recordings. This line-up remained stable until 2019, when the band parted ways with Kelly after discovering his history of domestic violence against his family, though this would not come to light until August 2022 out of respect for the privacy of Kelly's family members.

Neurosis have garnered critical recognition over the course of their 11 studio albums. The BBC credited them with taking "heavy music to previously unimaginable spaces ... [and shaping] metal's definitive response to the 21st century."

History

Formation and early years (1985–1995)
In late 1985, Scott Kelly, Dave Edwardson, and Jason Roeder, formerly members of Violent Coercion, founded Neurosis as a hardcore punk outfit, inspired also by British crust punk in the vein of Amebix and Crass.

In 1986 Chad Salter was added on second guitar and vocals. There have only been a few changes in the lineup of Neurosis' musicians since band's inception. In 1989 guitarist/vocalist Chad Salter was replaced by Steve Von Till, who previously played in bands Transgressor, Peace Test and Tribe of Resistance, and in 1990, Simon McIlroy joined the band as a synthesizer/sampler with Adam Kendall as visual artist (Adam and Simon have been friends since they were teenagers and they were doing a lot of experimental music together before). In 1995 Noah Landis, a childhood friend of Dave Edwardson, replaced Simon McIlroy as keyboardist.

With The Word as Law, Neurosis began to transition from the hardcore punk of Pain of Mind to the more experimental sound of Souls at Zero, which would ultimately form the basis for post-metal and atmospheric sludge metal. Neurosis' signature sound came into full force with Enemy of the Sun, with The Quietus observing that "at the time few could have predicted this black hole of agonizingly precise metal riffs, unnerving backmasking, industrial folkisms and extensive sampling".

Through Silver in Blood to The Eye of Every Storm (1996–2004)
In 1996, Neurosis attracted mainstream attention with its Relapse Records debut, Through Silver in Blood and subsequent tour with Pantera. In 1999, Neurosis released Times of Grace, which was designed to be played synchronously with Grace, an album released by Neurosis' ambient side project, Tribes of Neurot.

In the early 2000s, the band founded their own independent record label, Neurot Recordings, which, in addition to releasing material from Neurosis and its associated projects, signed several other artists.

Beginning with A Sun That Never Sets, Neurosis began incorporating clean vocals and acoustic instrumentation with a growing folk music influence, more noted presence of classical string instruments (which had been used sparsely since Souls At Zero) as well as slower tempos and a more contemplative sound. Allmusic described this change as an "aesthetic sea change". 2004's The Eye of Every Storm expanded upon this change by incorporating more ambient textures into the mix and presenting a softer post-rock oriented sound.

Given to the Rising, Honor Found in Decay,  Fires Within Fires (2007–2019)

The band released their ninth studio album Given to the Rising on May 8, 2007, through Neurot Records. On this album Neurosis re-incorporated a more aggressive approach into their music once again, and the album was well received by critics.

The band entered the studio in December 2011 to record the follow-up to Given to the Rising. The new album, entitled Honor Found in Decay, was released in late October 2012.

The band performed at Roadburn 2016, with Brooklyn Vegan's Ian Cory writing that "once the house lights came up it was hard to justify watching anything else." This was part of their series of shows performed in celebration of their 30th anniversary as a band.

On May 5, 2016, relapse Records confirmed they were reissuing A Sun That Never Sets and The Eye of Every Storm on vinyl on June 17 with new artwork.

On August 1, 2016, the band released a teaser trailer for their upcoming album online. Their eleventh studio album, titled Fires Within Fires, was released on September 23, 2016.

Scott Kelly's dismissal (2019–present) 
Following a Facebook post confessing to allegations of abuse towards his wife and family, Scott Kelly retired from music and public life in August 2022.

According to a statement released by the band's Facebook page the next day, Kelly had been quietly expelled from the group in 2019 when his bandmates discovered the extent of his abuse and domestic violence. The band never made any prior formal announcements regarding this "out of respect for [Kelly's] wife's direct request for privacy, and to honor the family's wish not to let their experience become gossip in a music magazine." In the lengthy post, the band condemned Kelly's abuse and described being filled with "disgust and disappointment" towards "a man who we once called Brother". , there is no announcement or info on whether or not the band will continue or disband, as "in due course, when it's appropriate, we will provide more information about our future musical endeavors, but that time is not now."

Visuals
From 1990 to 1993, Adam G. Kendall was recruited to create visuals and perform live with the band. Following his departure from touring, Pete Inc. took over the job, although Kendall continued to contribute visuals for the band until as late as 1997. Kendall also shot the footage for the "Locust Star" video.

Josh Graham took over live visuals in early 2000 as Pete wasn't "cutting the mustard" (in the words of Steve Von Till), and created album artwork for 2004's The Eye of Every Storm, 2007's Given to the Rising, and 2012's Honor Found in Decay, as well as re-designs for the reissues of Souls at Zero and Enemy of the Sun. Graham and Neurosis amicably parted ways in late November 2012 via an announcement on the band website. He was not replaced and the band ceased to use live visual media.

Often experimental and psychedelic in nature, Neurosis' visual media have added to the reputation of their live performances. Many of the visuals for their tours supporting Through Silver in Blood are taken from Ken Russell's film Altered States. Other images are included in the enhanced portion of the Sovereign EP, and on the A Sun That Never Sets DVD video release. The majority of the DVD release was directed by Graham, with an additional video by Chad Rullman.

Musical style and influences
Neurosis formed as a hardcore punk band, performing a blend of hardcore and heavy metal inspired by British punk and described as crust punk or crossover. Already their second album The Word as Law (1990) incorporated avant-garde music and sludge metal, a genre marrying the ferocity of hardcore and the deep heaviness of doom metal. Thereafter, the band developed an original sound. Greg Moffitt of the BBC wrote that through a "process of evolution and refinement" beginning with their third album Souls at Zero (1992) and culminating in their fifth, Through Silver in Blood (1996), they "[took] heavy music to previously unimaginable spaces and, in the process, shape[d] what has thus far been metal's definitive response to the 21st century."

The style Neurosis pioneered has been named post-metal, an "expansive, progressive and often apocalyptic" sound, "adding alien sounds, oddball instrumentation and atmospheric depth to [the] viscerally crushing approach" of sludge metal. Their sound has also been described as experimental/avant-garde metal, doom metal, post-hardcore, industrial metal, drone metal, stoner metal, psychedelic metal, progressive metal, alternative metal, art metal, and extreme metal, and as employing elements of folk. Steve Huey of AllMusic called it sludge infused with industrial, metal, and alternative rock, while Kory Grow of Rolling Stone called it a mix of "metal, punk, sludge and avant-garde experiments."

When asked what the band's influences are in a 2000 interview, Scott Kelly stated: "Mainly ourselves at this point, but our foundation ranges through Black Flag, Pink Floyd, Die Kreuzen, Amebix, Jimi Hendrix, King Crimson, The Melvins, Celtic Frost and, of course, Hank Williams." In other interviews, members of the band also listed Throbbing Gristle, Joy Division, Black Sabbath, Crass, Voivod, Loop, Godflesh, Swans, and Townes Van Zandt as influences. In 2007, Steve Von Till stated that lyrically he and Kelly are inspired by literature, alluding to writers such as Cormac McCarthy, Jack London, and Paul Bowles.

Some commentators note that both sonically and lyrically, Neurosis convey an intense emotional-spiritual effect. There is a mythical aspect to their imagery or a ritual aspect to their performance. Brandon Geist of Revolver relates that "Kelly and Von Till ... speak about their band in bold, quasi-religious, 'honor and glory'–type language. Words like commitment, sacrifice, surrender, and spirit come up a lot."

Many bands and artists have cited Neurosis as an important inspiration, including 
Converge, 
Slipknot, 
Agalloch, 
Yob, 
Isis, 
Mastodon, 
Amenra, 
Kylesa, 
Pelican, 
Wolves in the Throne Room, 
Cobalt, 
Withered, 
Baroness, 
Oathbreaker, 
Chelsea Wolfe, 
Pallbearer, and
Full of Hell. 
Their influence echoes through acts that have defined the post-metal genre, such as Isis, Justin Broadrick, Earth, Boris, Agalloch, Amenra, Pelican, and Deafheaven.

Members

Current
 Dave Edwardson — bass, backing vocals (1985–present)
 Jason Roeder — drums, percussion (1985–present)
 Steve Von Till — guitar, vocals (1989–present)
 Noah Landis — keyboards, synthesizers, effects, programming, samples, backing vocals (1995–present)

Former
 Scott Kelly — vocals, guitar (1985–2019)
 Chad "Gator Tofu" Salter — guitar, backing vocals (1986–1989)
 Simon McIlroy — keyboards, synthesizers, samples, programming, production, backing vocals (1990–1995), visual art (1990–1993)

Visual artists
 Adam Kendall (1990–1993)
 Pete Inc. (1993–2000)
 Josh Graham (2000–2012)

Timeline

Discography

Studio albums
 Pain of Mind (1987)
 The Word as Law (1990)
 Souls at Zero (1992)
 Enemy of the Sun (1993)
 Through Silver in Blood (1996)
 Times of Grace (1999)
 A Sun That Never Sets (2001)
 Neurosis & Jarboe (2003) - collaboration album with Jarboe
 The Eye of Every Storm (2004)
 Given to the Rising (2007)
 Honor Found in Decay (2012)
 Fires Within Fires (2016)

Side projects
 Tribes of Neurot - The "alter ego" of Neurosis; a collective of musicians that create dark ambient and noise music.
 Blood and Time - An acoustic side project of Neurosis with apocalyptic folk overtones featuring Josh Graham, Noah Landis and Scott Kelly.
 Culper Ring - A brief side project of Neurosis experimenting with dark ambient and industrial music featuring Steve Von Till.
 Red Sparowes - A group formerly featuring Josh Graham, as he departed the group early 2008.
 A Storm of Light - A heavy/drone/experimental/rock band featuring Josh Graham.
 Battle of Mice - A post hardcore band featuring Josh Graham.
 Harvestman - an ambient/industrial side band featuring Steve Von Till.
 Violent Coercion - pre-Neurosis Hardcore/punk band with Scott Kelly on guitar, Dave Edwardson on bass and Jason Roeder on drums.
 Jesus Fucking Christ - A heavy punk/thrash band reminiscent of Pain of Mind-era Neurosis featuring Dave Edwardson on bass and vocals.
 Kicker - A '77 punk/UK82 band featuring Dave Edwardson on bass and Pete the Roadie, former Neurosis roadie, on vocals.
 Shrinebuilder - A stoner metal "super group" featuring Scott Kelly.
 Corrections House - A drone/doom/experimental "super group" featuring Scott Kelly.
 Mirrors For Psychic Warfare - An experimental noise project featuring Scott Kelly.
 Sleep - A Doom Metal Band featuring Jason Roeder

References

External links

 Neurosis official website
 

American post-metal musical groups
American avant-garde metal musical groups
American doom metal musical groups
Hardcore punk groups from California
American sludge metal musical groups
Drone metal musical groups
American post-hardcore musical groups
American industrial metal musical groups
American progressive metal musical groups
Heavy metal musical groups from California
Psychedelic rock music groups from California
Musical groups from Oakland, California
Relapse Records artists
Musical groups established in 1985
Alternative Tentacles artists
1985 establishments in California
American crust and d-beat groups